Acacia solenota is a shrub belonging to the genus Acacia and the subgenus Juliflorae that is endemic to north eastern Australia. The species was listed as vulnerable under the Environment Protection and Biodiversity Conservation Act 1999 in 2008.

Description
The glabrous branchlets have reddish brown coloured new growth that is sometimes scurfy. Like most species of Acacia it has phyllodes rather than true leaves. The phyllodes are obtuse with a small callus mucro and have several fine, longitudinal nerves with two or three that are more prominent than the others. The valves of the pods are widest near apex and then narrow toward the base and open elastically from the apex.

Distribution

See also
 List of Acacia species

References

solenota
Flora of Queensland
Plants described in 1999
Taxa named by Leslie Pedley